, colloquially known as , is a private, non-denominational Christian coeducational university in Japan.   The university  offers Bachelor's, Master's, and Doctoral degrees to around 25,000 students in almost 40 different disciplines across 11 undergraduate and 14 graduate programs. The university has a central campus in the city of Nishinomiya, and also has satellite campuses in Nishinomiya, Sanda, Osaka, and Tokyo. Kwansei Gakuin University has been selected for inclusion in the Japanese government's Top Global University Project as a Type B (Global Traction) university. The university is often referred to as one of the four leading private universities in the greater Kansai region.

Overview

School name

The unusual romanization of Kansai as Kwansei is due to the way it would have been pronounced by progressive students in the late 19th century, when Kan-on pronunciations are seen as more educated. The "official" pronunciation of kwan can be heard in performances of the school song, but the modern pronunciation of kan is the standard in other contexts. Though the university is commonly referred to as Kangaku, it would also be correct to say Kwangaku.

School motto
In the context of "Mastery for Service," a "master" is an accomplished person in terms of their humanity, learning, and daily life. Kwansei Gakuin's avowed goal is to help students "master their God-given gifts in order to serve their neighbors, society and the world."

School symbol
Kwansei Gakuin's symbol, the crescent moon, represents the purpose of education: students' growth to fullness in knowledge and wisdom.

International relations
Kwansei Gakuin University has agreements with several United Nations organizations. The university and United Nations Volunteers (UNV) reached an agreement establishing the university as the first institution of higher education in Asia to form a volunteer-sending partnership with the United Nations Information Technology Service (UNITeS) in 2003. KGU and the United Nations High Commissioner for Refugees (UNHCR) representation in Japan concluded an agreement to establish a special university scholarship system for refugees in Japan in May 2006. Under this agreement, Kwansei Gakuin started the UNHCR-KGU Higher Education Program for Refugees in Japan in April 2007, and two refugees were enrolled.

Academics and organization

Undergraduate departments
School of Theology (established in 1952)
School of Humanities (1934)
School of Sociology (1960)
School of Law and Politics (1948)
School of Economics (1934)
School of Business Administration (1951)
School of Science and Technology (1961–2000 Nishinomiya Uegahara Campus, 2001–present Kobe-Sanda Campus)
School of Policy Studies (1995, Kobe-Sanda Campus)
School of Human Welfare Studies (2008)
School of Education (2009)
School of International Studies (2010)

Postgraduate departments

Graduate schools
Graduate School of Theology (1952)
Graduate School of Humanities (1950)
Graduate School of Sociology (1961)
Graduate School of Law and Politics (1950)
Graduate School of Economics (1950)
Graduate School of Business Administration (1953)
Graduate School of Science and Technology (1965, Kobe-Sanda Campus)
Graduate School of Policy Studies (2001, Kobe-Sanda Campus)
Graduate School of Language, Communication, and Culture (2001)
Graduate School of Human Welfare Studies (2010)
Graduate School of Education (2009)

Professional schools (KGPS)
Law School
Institute of Business and Accounting

Study abroad agreements
Kwansei Gakuin University has over 140 partner institutions overseas, and accepts more than 700 international students each year.

Campus locations

Since 1929, the university's flagship Uegahara campus has been located in Nishinomiya, Hyōgo. The Uegahara campus was designed in a "Spanish Mission" style by William Merrell Vories (1880-1964), an American missionary, architect, educator, and entrepreneur. In 2017, the campus won an achievement award for its design from the Architectural Institute of Japan. This campus is home to most of the administrative offices of Kwansei Gakuin.

The Nishinomiya Seiwa Campus (2009–present) is home to the School of Education and Seiwa Junior College. It is 10 minutes away from the Nishinomiya Uegahara Campus on foot.

The Kobe Sanda Campus (1995–present) is located in Sanda, Hyōgo and houses the School of Policy Studies and the School of Science and Technology. It has the same architectural style as its Nishinomiya-Uegahara predecessor, and is about an hour to 70 minutes from Nishinomiya by shuttle bus.

The Osaka Umeda Campus (2004–present) is located a short walk from the main public transport cluster of Osaka City. It holds graduate school classes for working people, and offers support for lifelong learning and student job placement.

The Tokyo Marunouchi Campus (2007–present)  is on the 10th floor of the Sapia Tower, next to Tokyo Station. In addition to serving as an information hub and offering lectures, the campus provides job placement support for alumni in the Tokyo metropolitan area.

Athletics
Kwansei Gakuin has one of the most diverse varsity athletic programs in Japan, with 34 varsity teams that compete in regional collegiate leagues. Although the school, unlike other private universities in the country, does not offer specific scholarships for student-athletes, it is still competitive with the top echelon of Japanese collegiate teams in the sports of American football, basketball, lacrosse and soccer.

The Fighters are one of the most decorated American football programs in Japan at the university level, with a record 33 national championships.

Alumni

References

External links
Official English site 

 
Educational institutions established in 1889
Kansai Big Six
Kansai Six (original)
Education in Osaka
Universities and colleges in Tokyo
Christian universities and colleges in Japan
Private universities and colleges in Japan
Universities and colleges affiliated with the United Methodist Church
Universities and colleges in Osaka Prefecture
Registered Monuments of Japan
Association of Christian Universities and Colleges in Asia
Kansai Collegiate American Football League
Seminaries and theological colleges in Japan
1889 establishments in Japan
Nishinomiya